Bart Sinteur (born 31 May 1998) is a Dutch football player. He plays for Jong FC Utrecht.

Club career
He made his Eerste Divisie debut for Jong FC Utrecht on 21 August 2017 in a game against FC Oss.

References

External links
 

1998 births
People from Leiderdorp
Living people
Dutch footballers
Jong FC Utrecht players
Eerste Divisie players
Association football defenders
Footballers from South Holland